Athletes from the Socialist Federal Republic of Yugoslavia competed at the 1980 Winter Olympics in Lake Placid, United States.

As Sarajevo would be the host city of the following Winter Olympics, the flag of Yugoslavia was raised at the closing ceremony.

Alpine skiing

Men

Women

Biathlon

Men

1A penalty loop of 150 metres had to be skied per missed target. 
2One minute added per close miss (a hit in the outer ring), two minutes added per complete miss.

Cross-country skiing

Men

Figure skating

Women

Ski jumping

References
Official Olympic Reports
International Olympic Committee results database
 Olympic Winter Games 1980, full results by sports-reference.com

Nations at the 1980 Winter Olympics
1980
Winter Olympics